The 1996 Trans America Athletic Conference baseball tournament was held at Conrad Park on the campus of Stetson in DeLand, Florida. This was the eighteenth tournament championship held by the Trans America Athletic Conference.  won their third tournament championship in four years, and second of three in a row, and earned the conference's automatic bid to the 1996 NCAA Division I baseball tournament.

Format and seeding 
The top six finishers by overall winning percentage qualified for the tournament, with the top seed playing the lowest seed in the first round.

Bracket

All-Tournament Team 
The following players were named to the All-Tournament Team.

Most Valuable Player 
Nick Presto was named Tournament Most Valuable Player. Presto was an infielder for Florida Atlantic.

References 

Tournament
ASUN Conference Baseball Tournament
Trans America Athletic Conference baseball tournament